Mary Immaculate is the Immaculate Conception of Mary in the teachings of the Catholic Church.

Mary Immaculate may also refer to:

United Kingdom
 St. Mary Immaculate Roman Catholic Church, Warwick, England
 Mary Immaculate and St Peter, New Barnet, London
 St. Mary Immaculate Catholic Primary School, Warwick, England
 Mary Immaculate High School, Vale of Glamorgan, Wales

Other locations
 Mary Immaculate College, Limerick, Ireland
 Mary Immaculate Seminary, Northampton, Pennsylvania, US (closed 1990)
 Mary Immaculate Girls' High School, Mumbai, India
 Mary Immaculate Church, Annerley, Queensland, Australia
 Mary Immaculate Catholic Church, Waverley, New South Wales, Australia
 Mary Immaculate School for Native Americans, Desmet, Idaho, United States
 Mary Immaculate Cathedral (Nelson, British Columbia), Canada

See also
"Immaculate Mary", a Roman Catholic hymn